Paradise is a 1991 drama film written and directed by Mary Agnes Donoghue. The original music score is composed by David Newman.

Melanie Griffith and Don Johnson (at the time married to each other) play Lily and Ben Reed, a young couple torn apart by a family tragedy. It would take a miracle to rekindle their love and a miracle arrives in the form of a summer guest - Willard Young (Elijah Wood).

It is a remake of the French film Le Grand Chemin by Jean-Loup Hubert.

Plot

Willard Young is a 10-year-old boy who is sent by his mother to stay with her best friend Lily Reed, who lives in the Delta shrimp-fishing country in a town called Paradise. At that town, Willard meets 9-year-old Billie Pike. Despite Billie being a troublemaker, she becomes friends with Willard. Lily and Ben also become fond of Willard despite the tragedy of their 2-year old son’s death. Soon, Billie teaches Willard to face his fears although Billie has troubles of her own. When Billie finds out her dad is a skater, she goes to a skating area with Willard only for her dad to tell her to leave much to Billie’s dismay.

Later at a party, Billie tells Willard his father left him and his mother for another woman. Upon hearing this, Willard becomes so upset that he runs away and goes missing for a while. When Ben finds him, he doesn’t trust him until he saves him from a bad accident. Later in the film, Lily blames herself for her son’s death but Ben reassures her. Towards the end of the film, Willard has to go home and he sees his mother’s new baby. The film ends with Lily and Ben kissing under their porch. That doesn’t mean that they have recovered from the tragedy but it does mean that they have regained their love.

Cast

Reception
Paradise received mixed to negative reviews from critics, as it holds a 33% rating on Rotten Tomatoes from 12 reviews. Audiences polled by CinemaScore gave the film an average grade of "A−" on an A+ to F scale.

References

External links
 
 
 
 

1991 films
1991 drama films
American remakes of French films
Films based on French novels
Touchstone Pictures films
Interscope Communications films
American drama films
Films scored by David Newman
1991 directorial debut films
Films produced by Scott Kroopf
1990s English-language films
1990s American films